NORMAPME or European Office of Crafts, Trades and Small and Medium-sized Enterprises for Standardisation was created in 1996 by UEAPME with the support of the European Commission. The German name is: Europäisches Büro des Handwerks und der Klein- und Mittelbetriebe für Normung.

NORMAPME participated in the standardisation process on behalf of SMEs and is an associate member of CEN, ISO, CENELEC & ETSI.

NORMAPME has been suspended earlier to the delegates meeting of EMU (European Metal Union) 19 September 2013 in Austria.

Activities 
Technical Committees: NORMAPME recruits experts from SME organisations to follow and report the work in European and International TCs in their fields of expertise.
Political Interventions: Political influence is possible for NORMAPME through its membership in ISO, CEN, CENELEC & ETSI and through our recognition by the European Commission.
Projects: NORMAPME aims at providing tools for SMEs and creating European networks

Information policy 
Any SMEs can regularly receive from NORMAPME updates on standardisation mandates, ongoing technical committees, issues and stakes for SMEs, and assistance to obtain CE marking, etc...

All publications and the website are translated in six languages: English, French, German, Spanish, Italian and Polish.

Members 
Founding members
 Union Européenne de l'Artisanat et des Petites et Moyennes Enterprises
 European Builders Confederation
 European Metal Union
 Jeunes Entrepreneurs de l'Union Européene
 International Federation for the Roofing Trade

Full members
 Comité International de l'Entretien du Textile
 European Consortium of Anchors Produces
 Fédération Européenne et Internationale des Patrons Prothésístes Dentaires
 EUROWINDOOR
 Europäsische Vereinigung des Holzbaus
 Génie Climatique International-Union internationale de la plombiere et de la couverture
 Bureau International Permanent des Associates de Vendeurs et Rechapeurs de pneumatiques
 European Waterpark Association
 European Federation for Elevator Small and Medium-sized Enterprises
 European Lift Components Association
 European Multifoil Manufacturers

Associate members
 Fundació International de la Dona Emprenedora
 Syndicat des Fabricants d’Isolants Réflecteurs Minces Multicouches
 Fédération Nationale des Scieries

Partners
 Council of Small Business of Australia

External links

References 

Organizations related to small and medium-sized enterprises
Pan-European trade and professional organizations